Sesame Place San Diego is a children's theme park and water park, located in Chula Vista, California. It opened on March 26, 2022 on the former site of Aquatica San Diego. It is the first theme park in the world to open up as a certified autism center by the International Board of Credentialing and Continuing Education Standards (IBCCES). Sesame Place in Philadelphia, Pennsylvania, was the first theme park in the world to be a certified autism center.

Sesame Place San Diego is owned and operated by SeaWorld Parks & Entertainment, which operates the park under an exclusive license from Sesame Workshop, the non-profit owner of Sesame Street.

History

As a Water Park
Sesame Place San Diego originally opened on May 31, 1997, as White Water Canyon, being operated independently. At the time it featured 16 water slides and a wave pool, with a western theme applied to it. The park suffered from many management and construction problems, and the poor attendance led to the park filing for Chapter 11 Bankruptcy in June 1998.

In December 1999, Cedar Fair purchased the park from its original owners for $11.5 million. Under its new ownership, Cedar Fair gave the park a new beach-theme and a rename to Knott's Soak City U.S.A. for its reopening on May 27, 2000.

On November 20, 2012, Cedar Fair announced it had sold the park to SeaWorld Parks & Entertainment. The acquisition saw the park transformed into a  water park named Aquatica San Diego. The refurbished park reopened on June 1, 2013. It features a wide array of attractions for all ages and swimming abilities, one of which passes by a flamingo habitat. The water park was featured on the episode, "Appalachian Splashin" on Xtreme Waterparks.

As Sesame Place San Diego
In 2017, Sesame Workshop announced that a new Sesame Place park would open "no later than" mid-2021. The location of the new park was soon revealed in 2019 when SeaWorld announced that Aquatica San Diego would be re-branded as Sesame Place San Diego park for the 2021 season. The Sesame Street-themed park would feature tame roller coasters, carousels and other family-friendly rides, the street made famous on TV, a parade, live shows, character interactions, and other attractions. The park retained the Aquatica water attractions into the new park, although one of the rides was removed for being deemed too extreme for the retheming.

Construction took place in phases, allowing Aquatica to remain open for the time period. The park's opening was soon delayed to 2022, due to the COVID-19 pandemic halting construction. Aquatica soon closed for its final season on September 12, 2021, and the remains of the park were transformed into Sesame Place San Diego.

In November 2021, it was confirmed that the newly themed park would open in March 2022.

The park opened on March 26, 2022.

Attractions
As the park was originally a water park, Sesame Place San Diego contains mostly water attractions, but with its retheming, several dry attractions are included as well.

Dry Attractions

In addition to the rides, a replica of Sesame Street called "Sesame Street Neighborhood" is also featured, alongside photo ops with many Sesame Street characters.

Water Attractions

References

External links 
 Sesame Place official site

Buildings and structures in San Diego
1997 establishments in California
SeaWorld Parks & Entertainment
Tourist attractions in San Diego
Amusement parks in California
Chula Vista, California